Rafał Brzozowski (born 8 June 1981) is a Polish singer and television presenter. His career started through participation in the first season of The Voice of Poland in 2011. He hosted the Polish version of Wheel of Fortune.

Brzozowski attempted to represent Poland in the Eurovision Song Contest 2017 with the song "Sky Over Europe", finishing second in the national final Krajowe Eliminacje.

He co-hosted the 2020 Junior Eurovision Song Contest.

He represented Poland in the Eurovision Song Contest 2021 in Rotterdam with the song "The Ride", but failed to qualify to the final, finishing 14th in second semi-final with 35 points.

Discography

Studio albums

Extended plays

Singles

References

External links

1981 births
Living people
Polish singers
The Voice (franchise) contestants
Eurovision Song Contest entrants of 2021
Eurovision Song Contest entrants for Poland
Polish television personalities
Musicians from Warsaw